Richard R. Hoover is a visual effects artist noted for his work on Armageddon, Superman Returns and Blade Runner 2049.

Bio

Hoover earned a fine arts degree from the University of Oregon in 1980.

Oscar Nominations

Both are in the category of  Best Visual Effects.

71st Academy Awards - Nominated for Armageddon. Nomination shared with John Frazier and Patrick McClung. Lost to What Dreams May Come.
79th Academy Awards - Nominated for Superman Returns. Nomination shared with Mark Stetson, Neil Corbould and Jon Thum. Lost to Pirates of the Caribbean: Dead Man's Chest.
90th Academy Awards- Won for Blade Runner 2049. Nomination shared with John Nelson, Gerd Nefzer, and Paul Lambert.

Selected filmography

 Jungle 2 Jungle (1997)
 Armageddon (1998)
 Inspector Gadget (1999)
 Unbreakable (2000)
 Seabiscuit (2003)
 Anchorman: The Legend of Ron Burgundy (2004)
 Superman Returns (2006)
 Valkyrie (2008)
 Cats & Dogs: The Revenge of Kitty Galore (2010)
 The Smurfs (2011)
 The Smurfs 2 (2013)
 Blade Runner 2049 (2017)
Red Notice (2021)

References

External links

Living people
Special effects people
Year of birth missing (living people)
Best Visual Effects Academy Award winners
Best Visual Effects BAFTA Award winners
University of Oregon alumni